The 2011–12 Canadian Interuniversity Sport women's ice hockey season represented a season of play in Canadian Interuniversity Sport women's ice hockey. The Calgary Dinos women's ice hockey program claimed their first CIS national title.

Offseason
On August 2, 2011, Jen Rawson left her assistant coaching position with the Toronto Lady Blues to assume the head coaching role for the University of British Columbia Thunderbirds. In the previous year, the Thunderbirds ranked sixth in the Canada West standings with a won loss record of 7-16-1. Rawson was tasked with helping the squad qualify for its first trip to the postseason since the 2008–09 season.

Preseason

Carleton Ravens invitational tournament

Exhibition

NCAA exhibition

Regular season

News and notes
September 27, 2011: Hayley Wickenheiser was honoured as a CIS  Top Eight Academic All-Canadian. She became the first Calgary Dinos student-athlete to earn the top academic honour in CIS since soccer player Kelly Matheson in 2000.
October 7: Leslie Oles scored twice, while adding a pair of assists as the McGill Martlets defeated Concordia by a 7-5 tally. It was the Martlets 106th consecutive victory over conference opponents. The win was also their 38th in a row over the Concordia Stingers. Head coach Peter Smith earned his 301st career win. 
October 13: During the weekend of October 14–16, all CIS hockey teams will use the RUBR brand puck. It is a Canadian-made hockey puck produced with rubber tapped naturally from the trees of Liberia.
October 14: The Queen's Golden Gaels defeated the Chinese national women's ice hockey team by a 6-1 tally.
October 14: Saskatchewan Huskies players Kelsey Tulloch and Danny Stone each logged a pair of goals to win their season opener versus the Regina Cougars by a 7-1 tally.
October 16: Laura Jordan of the University of British Columbia Thunderbirds tallied two goals in a 4-2 victory over the Lethbridge Pronghorns. It was Jen Rawson's first win as the UBC head coach.
October 29: Montreal Carabins skater Ariane Barker scored with 71 seconds left to give the squad a 3-2 win at McConnell Arena. Martlets goaltender Charline Labonte took the loss for the Martlets, giving her a 69-2 overall record in her CIS career. It marked the Martlets first loss to a Quebec conference opponent for the first time in 108 games.

Season standings

Postseason
On February 25, 2012, Iya Gavrilova scored the game-winning goal in the deciding game of the 2012 Canada West tournament, as the Calgary Dinos claimed their first ever tournament title.

Awards and honors

OUA awards
Player of the Year: Morgan McHaffie – Queen's
Rookie of the Year: Rebecca Bouwhuis – Waterloo
Marion Hillard Award Nominee: Jill Morillo – UOIT
Coach of the Year: Shaun Reagan – Waterloo

RSEQ Awards
Ann-Sophie Bettez, McGill, RSEQ Most Outstanding Player
Melodie Daoust, McGill, RSEQ Rookie of the Year
Kristen MacDonald, Carleton, RSEQ Leadership and Social Implication Award
Peter Smith, McGill, RSEQ Coach of the Year

Canada West awards
Julie Paetsch, Saskatchewan, Player of the Year
Kelsey Tulloch, Saskatchewan, Canada West nominee, Marion Hilliard Award
2012 Canada West Rookie of the Year: Sadie Lenstra
2012 Canada West Coach of the Year: Chandy Kaip, Lethbridge

Atlantic University Sport
 Atlantic University Sport Most valuable player: Alex Normore, St. Francis Xavier
 Atlantic University Sport Rookie of the Year: Marie-Pier Arsenault, Moncton
 Atlantic University Sport Most sportsmanlike player, Ashlyn Somers, Mount Allison Mounties 
 Atlantic University Sport Student-athlete community service award, Kayla Blackmore, St. Thomas
 Atlantic University Sport Coach of the Year, Bruce Donaldson, UPEI

See also
Canadian Interuniversity Sport women's ice hockey championship
2009–10 Canadian Interuniversity Sport women's ice hockey season
2006–07 Canadian Interuniversity Sport women's ice hockey season
2011–12 NCAA Division I women's ice hockey season
2012 CIS Women's Ice Hockey Championship

References

External links
 The official site of CIS Women's Hockey Championship
  2011-12 News of women's ice hockey Championship
  CIS 2012 Women's Hockey Championship

 
Inter
U Sports women's ice hockey seasons